Getting Started is a 1979 animated short by Richard Condie and produced in Winnipeg by the National Film Board of Canada.

Summary
The film is a comical look at procrastination, based partly on the filmmaker's own experiences, portraying the inability of a pianist to rehearse a Debussy composition.

Accolades
Awards for Getting Started included the Genie Award for best animation film. The film also won awards at the Zagreb World Festival of Animated Films and the Tampere Film Festival, as well as the Bijou Award for Best Animation.

Credits
 Story, Animation, Direction: Richard Condie
 Backgrounds: Sharon Condie
 Music: Patrick Godfrey - From Debussy's Children's Corner
 Voices: Richard Condie and Jay Brazeau
 Inker: Mary-Lou Storey
 Painter: Gloria Thorsteinson
 Animation Camera: Svend-Erik Eriksen and Tom Brydon
 Sound Editor: Ken Rodeck
 Re-Recording: Clive Perry
 Studio Administrator: Charles Lough
 Producer: Jerry Krepakevich
 Executive Producer: Michael Scott
 Getting Started
 A National Film Board Of Canada - Prairie Production

References

External links
Watch Getting Started at NFB.ca

Getting Started on YouTube

1979 films
National Film Board of Canada animated short films
Films directed by Richard Condie
Best Animated Short Film Genie and Canadian Screen Award winners
Films about pianos and pianists
Canadian comedy short films
1979 animated films
1970s animated short films
Animated comedy films
Canadian animated short films
Animated films about mice
1970s English-language films
1970s Canadian films